Dirk Heylen (born 23 August 1967) is a Belgian curler and curling coach.

He is left-handed and has been curling since 2003.

Teams

Men's

Mixed

Mixed doubles

Record as a coach of national teams

References

External links

 Dirk Heylen - Players Passport - Belgian Curling Association
 
 

Living people
1967 births
Belgian male curlers

Belgian curling coaches
Place of birth missing (living people)